Kiero Small (born May 1, 1989) is a former American football fullback. He was drafted by the Seattle Seahawks in the seventh round of the 2014 NFL Draft. He played college football at Arkansas.

College career
Small played his freshman and sophomore seasons at Hartnell College, a junior college in Salinas, CA. He signed with the University of Arkansas in 2011 as an inside linebacker, but was moved to offense and converted to a fullback prior to his junior season with the Razorbacks. Arkansas finished 2011 ranked #5 in the final polls with an 11-2 record after beating Kansas State in the 2012 Cotton Bowl Classic. Small suffered an injury early in his 2012 senior campaign and was forced to redshirt. As a redshirt senior in 2013, Small played a significant role in Bret Bielema's first season as a devastating blocking back, as well as a receiver out of the backfield, scoring 3 rushing touchdowns and 1 receiving for the season.

Professional career

Seattle Seahawks
Small was drafted by the Seattle Seahawks in the seventh round with the 227th overall pick of the 2014 NFL Draft.

His contract with the Seahawks was terminated on August 30, 2014.

Cleveland Browns

Small was signed to the Cleveland Browns practice squad on September 9, 2014.

He was waived by the Cleveland Browns on November 11, 2014.

Baltimore Ravens
On November 13, 2014, he signed with the Baltimore Ravens practice squad. On September 5, 2015, he was released by the Ravens.

References

External links
Arkansas Razorbacks bio

1989 births
Living people
Players of American football from Baltimore
American football fullbacks
Arkansas Razorbacks football players
Seattle Seahawks players
Cleveland Browns players
Baltimore Ravens players